Viljakkala is a former municipality of Finland.

It was located in the province of Western Finland and was part of the Pirkanmaa region. The municipality had a population of 2,043 (2003) and covered an area of 224.70 km² of which 24.61 km² was water. The population density was 10.2 inhabitants per km². Viljakkala was consolidated with Ylöjärvi on January 1, 2007.

The municipality was unilingually Finnish.

External links 
 

Populated places disestablished in 2007
Former municipalities of Finland
Ylöjärvi